Silver sulfide is an inorganic compound with the formula . A dense black solid, it is the only sulfide of silver. It is useful as a photosensitizer in photography. It  constitutes the tarnish that forms over time on silverware and other silver objects. Silver sulfide is insoluble in most solvents, but is degraded by strong acids. Silver sulfide is a network solid made up of silver (electronegativity of 1.98) and sulfur (electronegativity of 2.58) where the bonds have low ionic character (approximately 10%).

Formation 
Silver sulfide naturally occurs as the tarnish on silverware. When combined with silver, hydrogen sulfide gas creates a layer of black silver sulfide patina on the silver, protecting the inner silver from further conversion to silver sulfide. Silver whiskers can form when silver sulfide forms on the surface of silver electrical contacts operating in an atmosphere rich in hydrogen sulfide and high humidity. Such atmospheres can exist in sewage treatment and paper mills.

Structure and properties
Three forms are known: monoclinic acanthite (β-form), stable below 179 °C, body centered cubic so-called argentite (α-form), stable above 180 °C, and a high temperature face-centred cubic (γ-form) stable above 586 °C. The higher temperature forms are electrical conductors. It is found in nature as relatively low temperature mineral acanthite. Acanthite is an important ore of silver. The acanthite, monoclinic, form features two kinds of silver centers, one with two and the other with three near neighbour sulfur atoms. Argentite refers to a cubic form, which, due to instability in "normal" temperatures, is found in form of the pseudomorphosis of acanthite after argentite.

History 
In 1833 Michael Faraday  noticed that the resistance of silver sulfide decreased dramatically as temperature increased. This constituted the first report of a semiconducting material.

Silver sulfide is a component of classical qualitative inorganic analysis.

References

External links
Tarnishing of Silver: A Short Review V&A Conservation Journal
Images of silver whiskers NASA

Sulfides
Silver compounds
Semiconductors